Todd Woodbridge and Mark Woodforde were the defending champions but only Woodbridge competed that year with Wayne Ferreira.

Ferreira and Woodbridge lost in the quarterfinals to Bob Bryan and Mike Bryan.

The Bryans won in the final 6–3, 3–6, 6–1 against Eric Taino and David Wheaton.

Seeds
The top four seeded teams received byes into the second round.

Draw

Finals

Top half

Bottom half

External links
 2001 Stella Artois Championships Doubles draw

2001 Stella Artois Championships